Tokyo! is a 2008 anthology film containing three segments written by three non-Japanese directors, all of which were filmed in Tokyo, Japan. Michel Gondry directed "Interior Design", Leos Carax directed "Merde", and Bong Joon-ho directed "Shaking Tokyo".

Plot

"Interior Design" 
Directed by Michel Gondry.  It is an adaptation of the short story comic "Cecil and Jordan in New York" by Gabrielle Bell.

Hiroko (Ayako Fujitani) and Akira (Ryō Kase) are a young couple from the provinces staying in Tokyo with limited funds and short-term lodging. They appear to have a solid and mutually supportive relationship that will seemingly carry each other through any challenge. Akira is an aspiring filmmaker who works as a gift wrapper at a local department store while he waits for his debut feature to screen in the city. The couple manage to secure short-term housing in their friend Akemi's (Ayumi Ito) cramped studio apartment. When Akemi's boyfriend grows weary of her house guests, Hiroko struggles to find a new apartment, only to find unsuitable and expensive housing.

After Akira's film screens to dubious acclaim, one spectator informs Hiroko of the inherent struggles in relationships between creative types: one half of the couple would feel invisible, useless, or unappreciated. Hiroko relates to these feelings wholeheartedly in the wake of her numerous trials and tribulations in the unfamiliar city of Tokyo, and starts to question her role in the relationship. Hiroko wakes up one morning and sees a small hole where light is going through her. When she goes to the bathroom and unbuttons her shirt, she is shocked to see a hand sized hole in her chest with a wooden pole down the middle. As she walks down the street, the hole gets bigger and she stumbles as both her feet turn to wooden poles. Eventually Hiroko is turned into an inanimate chair, with only her jacket left hanging on the back. People walking past are oblivious of the chair's presence until one man tries to drag it home. When his back is turned, the chair turns into a human Hiroko, who flees into a bus station nude and reassumes her chair form that an old woman briefly sits on.

Realizing that she can only turn human when no-one else sees her and will turn back into a chair in plain sight, she props herself in chair form on a street where a magician takes her up to his apartment and takes good care of her, which she appreciates. After briefly wandering around in his apartment alone, Hiroko writes a farewell letter to Akira, wishing him the best as his filmmaking career takes off.

"Merde" 
Directed by Léos Carax.

Merde (French for the swear "shit") is the name given to an unkempt, gibberish-spewing subterranean creature of the Tokyo sewers (Denis Lavant), who rises from the underground lair where he dwells to attack unsuspecting locals in increasingly brazen and terrifying ways. He steals cash and cigarettes from passers-by, frightens old women and sexually assaults schoolgirls, resulting in a televised media frenzy that creates mounting hysteria among the Tokyo populace. After discovering an arsenal of hand grenades in his underground lair, Merde goes on a rampage hurling the munitions at random citizens, which the media promptly cover. French magistrate Maître Voland (Jean-François Balmer) arrives in Tokyo to represent Merde's inevitable televised trial, claiming to be one of only three in the world able to speak his client's unintelligible language. The media circus mounts as lawyer defends client in a surreal court of law hungry for a satisfying resolution. Merde is tried, convicted and sentenced to death, until he survives his execution and disappears into a sewer vent.

"Shaking Tokyo" 
Directed by Bong Joon-ho.

Teruyuki Kagawa stars as a Tokyo shut-in, or hikikomori (Japanese:引きこもり), who has not left his apartment in a decade. His only link to the outside world is through his telephone, which he uses to take advantage of delivery services, such as the pizza that he orders every Saturday, thus resulting in hundreds of pizza cartons stacked throughout his room. One day, his pizza is delivered by a lovely young woman (Yū Aoi) who succeeds in catching the shut-in's eye. Suddenly, an earthquake strikes Tokyo, prompting the delivery woman to faint in the hikikomori's apartment, causing him to fall hopelessly in love. Time passes and the shut-in discovers through another pizza delivery person that the improbable object of his affections has become a hikikomori in her own right. Taking a bold leap into the unknown, he crosses the threshold of his apartment and takes to the streets in search of the girl, eventually discovering his kindred spirit at the very moment another earthquake strikes.

Cast

"Interior Design" 
 Ayako Fujitani as Hiroko
 Ryō Kase as Akira
 Ayumi Ito as Akemi
 Satoshi Tsumabuki as Takeshi

"Merde" 
 Denis Lavant as Mr Merde
 Jean-François Balmer as Mr Voland, the lawyer
 Julie Dreyfus as The interpreter
 Andrée Damant

"Shaking Tokyo" 
 Teruyuki Kagawa as the Hikikomori
 Yū Aoi as the Pizza delivery girl
 Naoto Takenaka as the Pizza store manager

Music 
During the credits HASYMO's single "Tokyo Town Pages" plays. The trailer features the track "Be Good" by Canadian indie-rock band Tokyo Police Club.

Reception 
Rotten Tomatoes gives the film a Critic score of 76%. The average rating stands at 6.4/10. Describing the film as "An imaginative, if uneven, love letter to a city that signals a great creative enterprise by its three contributing directors."

Metacritic rated it 63/100, based on 18 reviews.

Justin Chang of Variety described it as "uneven but enjoyable."

References

External links 
  
 
 
 
 

2008 films
2008 drama films
German drama films
Films about capital punishment
Films directed by Bong Joon-ho
Films directed by Leos Carax
Films directed by Michel Gondry
Films set in Tokyo
Films shot in Tokyo
French drama films
2000s French-language films
Japanese drama films
2000s Japanese-language films
South Korean drama films
Japan in non-Japanese culture
German anthology films
Japanese anthology films
French anthology films
South Korean anthology films
2000s French films
2000s German films
2000s South Korean films
Sponge Entertainment films